This is a list of articles and categories dealing with beer and breweries by region: the breweries and beers in various regions. Beer is the world's most widely consumed alcoholic drink, and is the third-most popular drink overall, after water and tea. It is thought by some to be the oldest fermented drink. A brewery is a dedicated building for the making of beer, though beer can be made at home, and has been for much of beer's history. A company that makes beer is called either a brewery or a brewing company. The diversity of size in breweries is matched by the diversity of processes, degrees of automation, and kinds of beer produced in breweries. A brewery is typically divided into distinct sections, with each section reserved for one part of the brewing process.

List

Africa

Botswana
 Kgalagadi Breweries Limited

Cape Verde

Egypt

Ethiopia

Kenya

Morocco

Nigeria

South Africa

Tanzania

Asia

Armenia

Beer has been brewed by Armenians since ancient times. One of the first confirmed written evidences of ancient beer production is Xenophon's reference to "wine made from barley" in one of the ancient Armenia villages, as described in his 5th century B.C. work Anabasis: "There were stores within of wheat and barley and vegetables, and wine made from barley in great big bowls; the grains of barley malt lay floating in the drink up to the lip of the vessel, and reeds lay in them, some longer, some shorter, without joints; when you were thirsty you must take one of these into your mouth, and suck. The drink without admixture of water was very strong, and of a delicious flavour to certain palates, but the taste must be acquired."

Currently there are six local brewing companies throughout the country producing a variety of beer types:
 Beer of Yerevan Brewery in Yerevan: around 15 types of beer are served by the brewery, mainly under the brand Kilikia (named after a historic Armenian kingdom at the Mediterranean coast) as well as some other brands.
 Gyumri Beer Brewery in Gyumri: the company produces a variety of lager beer under 3 brands: Gyumri, Aleksandrapol and  Ararat.
 Kotayk Brewery in Abovyan: a variety of lager beer under the brand Kotayk (named after the Armenian Kotayk Province), as well as Erebuni and Urartu.
 Lihnitis Sevan Brewery in Sevan: the company produces the Kellers beer.
 Hayasy Group in Voskevaz village, Aragatsotn Province: currently producing under the brand Hayasy.
 Dilijan Brewery in Dilijan: producing under the brand Dilijan.

In addition to brewing factories, the country is also home to 8 microbreweries/brewpubs, that produce and serve draught/unfiltered beer in Armenia.

China

Hong Kong

India

Indonesia

Israel

Japan

Malaysia

Myanmar

The dominant brewery in Myanmar, with an approximately 80% share of the market, is Myanmar Brewery, which is 45% owned by Union of Myanmar Economic Holdings Limited. Myanmar Brewery's beers include Myanmar Beer, Double Strong Beer, Andaman Gold (Red) and Andaman Gold (Blue). In 2015 Myanmar Brewery entered into a joint venture with Kirin Brewery to produce and distribute its beers in the country. In 2013 the Carlsberg Group signed an agreement with Myanmar Golden Star, establishing Myanmar Carlsberg Company Ltd. Myanmar Carlsberg Company opened a $75 million brewery in May 2015 which now produces Carlsberg and Turborg locally, together with a new beer, Yoma. In July 2015 Heineken International opened a $60 million brewery in Yangon, in a joint venture with a local company, Alliance Brewery Company. The brewery produces Tiger, Heineken, ABC stout and a new rice beer, Regal Seven.

North Korea

North Korea has at least ten major breweries and many microbreweries that supply a wide range of beer products. The top brand is the light lager Taedonggang which is internationally known for its quality.

The country's problems with goods distribution and power output has forced North Korean brewers to innovate. To minimize distribution, many restaurants and hotels maintain their own microbreweries. Because unreliable power supply makes it difficult to refrigerate beer, North Koreans have developed their own steam beer, an originally American beer style brewed in higher than normal temperatures, that is widely available.

Although the Korean liquor soju is preferred, beer comes second when it comes to consumption. Since the 1980s, beer has been within reach of ordinary North Koreans, though it is still rationed. Tourists, on the other hand, enjoy inexpensive beer without such limitations.

Philippines

Singapore

South Korea

Sri Lanka

Syria

Taiwan

Thailand

Turkey

Vietnam

Europe
Europe's largest single brewery and single malting facility in terms of installed capacity currently are the Obolon CJSC's production facility in Kyiv, Ukraine, and malting facility in Chemerivtsi, Khmelnytskyi Oblast, Ukraine, respectively

Albania
The best known beer in Albania is Birra Tirana. Also well-known beer brands are Birra Korça, Birra Kaon, Birra Puka and Birra Stela.

Austria

Belgium

Croatia

Czech Republic

Denmark

France

Germany

Greece

Hungary

Iceland

Ireland

Italy

Latvia
Beer is a historic traditions in Latvia and is known to have been made before the Northern Crusades in the 13th century. Today, the most popular brand in Latvia is Aldaris (based in Riga).

Lithuania

This Baltic state has a major beer scene in the northern part of the country, centred around the towns of Pasvalys, Pakruojis, Kupiškis and Biržai. The farmhouse brews of the region are highly distinctive, using local ingredients and techniques from pre-Soviet times.

The biggest commercial breweries are located in towns Utena (Utenos alus'''), Panevėžys (Kalnapilis), Klaipėda (Švyturys), Kaunas (Ragutis) and Vilnius (Tauras).

North Macedonia
The best-known beer in North Macedonia is Skopsko. There are also Silver Moon, Zlaten Dab, Bitolsko, Gorsko etc.

Netherlands

Norway

In addition to the major breweries that mostly brew pilsner beer, there are a number of microbreweries brewing a variety of other types of beer.

Poland

Portugal

Romania

Russia

Serbia

Slovakia
The most famous brands in Slovakia are Šariš, Smädný mních (Thirsty Monk) and Zlatý Bažant (Golden pheasant'').

There are 15 breweries in Slovakia:
 Pivovar Bytča (K. K. Company) - Martiner, Popper, Palatín
 Pivovar Corgoň (Heineken Slovensko a.s.) - Corgoň, Maurus, Stup
 Pivovar a sladovňa Gemer a.s. (Heineken Slovensko a.s.) - Gemer, Zuzana
 Pivovar Horden (Esperia a.s.) - Horden
 Pivovar Hurbanovo (Heineken Slovensko a.s.) - Zlatý Bažant, Heineken
 Pivovar Ilava (K. K. Company) - Richtár, Vartáš
 Pivovar Martiner (Heineken Slovensko a.s.) - Martiner, Martinský zdroj
 Minipivovar M.K. Unipol Trnava
 Steiger (Eduard Rada s.r.o.) - Steiger, Sitňan, Hell, Kachelmann
 Pivovar Stein a.s. - Stein, Pressburger, Premium Pils, Dominik
 Minipivovar Svätý Jur

Spain
Some known Spanish beers are Mahou-San Miguel (known as Mahou before the acquisition by San Miguel company), Estrella Damm, Alhambra, Estrella Galicia, Estrella Levante, Cruzcampo, Reina, Dorada and La Zaragozana (Ambar).

Sweden

United Kingdom

North America

Canada

Mexico

Beer in Mexico has a long history. Mesoamerican cultures knew of fermented alcoholic drinks, including a corn beer. Only two corporations, Grupo Modelo (owned by Anheuser-Busch InBev) and FEMSA (owned by Heineken International)  control the majority of the Mexican beer market. Beer is a major export for the country, with most going to the United States, but is available in over 150 countries in the world.

United States

Oceania

Australia

Cook Islands

Fiji

New Caledonia

New Zealand

Papua New Guinea

Samoa

Solomon Islands

Tahiti

Vanuatu

South America

Argentina
The predominant brewery in Argentina is AB InBev with a 65% of the market, with brands such as Quilmes, Brahma, Budweiser, Corona and Stella Artois. The second largest brewery is Compañía de las Cervecerías Unidas with a 33% share, which produces Heineken, Schneider, Imperial and Isenbeck. The best selling brands are Brahma, Quilmes, Schneider and Imperial.

Brazil

Colombia

With almost 90% of the Colombia market, Bavaria is the most popular Colombian beer.

Peru
The consumption per capita in Peru is 22 liters per year.

Three local producers are:
Sab Miller, with the local brands: Cusqueña, Cristal, Pilsen, Arequipeña and the Honduran but local-made Barena;
AmBev, with the Brazilian, but also local made, Brahma;
Ajeper, with the all new Franca. This is a Peruvian company.

Also, there is a selection of imported beers such as Erdinger and Flensburger from Germany, Strong Suffolk and Abbot from the UK, Corona from Mexico, Heineken from the Netherlands, Sapporo from Japan, Stella Artois (the Belgian brand, but made in Argentina), Quilmes also from Argentina, etc.

There are also small local producers of standard beer and many producers of the ancient beer named Chicha, normally made of a local corn named Jora in the traditional "Chicherías".

Venezuela

Beer consumption per capita

See also

 List of countries by alcohol consumption
 List of microbreweries
 List of national drinks
 Alcohol belts of Europe – Beer belt

References

Works cited

External links
 

Alcohol-related lists
Lists of breweries
Lists of companies by country and industry

World cuisine